The Competition Commission (CompCom) is a South Africa government agency and the country's anti-trust regulator. It has the power to block mergers and other transactions that would reduce competition. It blocked a proposed acquisition of Burger King South Africa over a lack of Black ownership.

References

External links

See also
Competition Tribunal (South Africa)

Government agencies of South Africa
Competition regulators